José Javier Curto Gines (born 31 December 1964 in Madrid) is a boccia player from Spain.  He has a physical disability: He has cerebral palsy and is a BC2 type athlete. He competed at the 2004 Summer Paralympics. He finished first in the one person BC2 boccia game.

References

External links 
 
 

1964 births
Living people
Spanish boccia players
Paralympic boccia players of Spain
Paralympic gold medalists for Spain
Paralympic medalists in boccia
Boccia players at the 2004 Summer Paralympics
Medalists at the 2004 Summer Paralympics
Sportspeople from Madrid